The Rio Grande Rivalry is the name given to the New Mexico–New Mexico State football rivalry and known as the Battle of I-25. It is an intercollegiate rivalry between The University of New Mexico and New Mexico State University. The rivalry began in 1894. In comparison, New Mexico was a United States Territory from September 1850 to January 1912, when it became a member of the United States and the Union.

For many years the rivalry was often referred to as the "Battle of I-25" in recognition of the campuses both being located along the Interstate Highway System.

Traditions
The Thursday evening before that year's rivalry football game, University of New Mexico students and student government annually host a celebration, the Red Rally, in which an effigy of an Aggie is set on fire. The Red Rally was rated on Sports Illustrated, "102 Things You Have to Do Before You Graduate."

Conversely, New Mexico State students set an effigy of a Lobo on fire the week of the game at the parking lot near Memorial Stadium.

Sports

Football

Men's Basketball

The men's basketball series between the schools has been more competitive than football, although UNM holds the all-time advantage in that series as well. Currently the Lobos hold a 121–99 advantage all-time over the Aggies. The December 19, 2007 contest was the 200th all-time meeting between the schools.

The UNM–NMSU series is somewhat unusual among non-conference rivalries in that the schools traditionally play a two-game home-and-home series each season (another example of such a rivalry is the Nashville mid-major matchup between Belmont and Lipscomb). Most other rivalries in which the schools are not members of the same conference usually only meet once per season. Although a few individuals have proposed cutting the series back to a more conventional single annual meeting, fan sentiment at both schools remains strong for preserving the traditional two meetings per season format. The meeting between both teams is generally the most anticipated sports game in New Mexico every year, while both teams are able to play at each other's schools.

Since 1949–1950, when both schools were classified as major schools, New Mexico holds a 77–65 advantage over New Mexico State. Recently, both teams have been competitive with each other - in the past ten years (2012-2022), the advantage is 10-8 New Mexico, while both teams went through a total of 7 head coaching changes (New Mexico 4, New Mexico State 3).

Memorable games 
"The Clock Game" – December 17, 1966

 NMSU's "Miracle Midgets" defeated the visiting second ranked Lobos in overtime due to a supposed clock malfunction. Played at Las Cruces High, the Lobos led by two with only 2 seconds left, but on an inbound play, the Lobos were called on a charge. Bob King argued that there would be, "no way to inbound the ball and take two dribbles without time expiring." The Aggies would make both free throws and win the game 62–61.

"The Shot" – December 16, 1995

 After missing two free throws to put the Lobos away, New Mexico's Clayton Shields rebounded the last missed free throw with 2.4 seconds left on the clock. He shot from 3/4 court to beat the Aggies 69–68.

Women's Basketball
The women's basketball series between UNM and NMSU has been defined by extended streaks of dominance by one program over the other. Prior to the mid-1990s the Roadrunners (as NMSU's women's programs were known prior to 2000) were dominant, winning the first meeting by a 57–53 tally on February 1, 1974, and proceeding to win 24 of the first 35 meetings between the schools. Between 1985 and 1995, NMSU ran off a streak of 16 consecutive wins over their in-state rivals. This stretch also covered a two-year period in which UNM did not field a women's basketball team. However, on November 24, 1996, UNM turned the tables on NMSU in a big way. The Lobos' 48–47 win on that day in Las Cruces started a 22-game winning streak by UNM over NMSU that continued unbroken, despite a few close calls, through the 2006–07 season. But on December 2, 2007, the Lady Aggies ended 11 years of frustration against their instate rivals by knocking off the Lady Lobos 58–42 at the Pan Am Center. UNM followed this with an 11-game win streak against the Lady Aggies, until the Lady Aggies beat UNM in 2014. NMSU then went on to win 3 of the next 4, to which UNM has now won 8 straight.

Like the men's teams, the UNM and NMSU women also traditionally play two games per year against each other, one game in each city.

Rio Grande Rivalry Championship
The Rio Grande Rivalry is a series between New Mexico and New Mexico State. In 15 years of the series, New Mexico has not lost yet to New Mexico State.

*COVID-19 shortened year

Scoreboard 2007–2008

Scoreboard 2008–2009

Scoreboard 2009–2010

Scoreboard 2010–2011

Scoreboard 2011–2012

Scoreboard 2012–2013

Scoreboard 2013-2014

Scoreboard 2014-2015

Scoreboard 2015-2016

Scoreboard 2016-2017

Scoreboard 2017-2018

Scoreboard 2018-2019

Scoreboard 2019-2020 (Shortened COVID-19 year)

Scoreboard 2020-2021 (Shortened COVID-19 year)

Scoreboard 2021-2022

Scoreboard 2022-2023

References

1894 establishments in New Mexico Territory
College sports rivalries in the United States
New Mexico Lobos basketball
New Mexico State Aggies basketball